Cai Yalin (Chinese: 蔡亚林; Pinyin: Cài Yàlín; born September 3, 1977 in Chengde, Hebei) is a male Chinese sports shooter. He won the 10 m air rifle at the 2000 Summer Olympics, in the process beating the Olympic record of 695.7pts with 696.4pts.

Major performances
 1997 National Games – 3rd
 1998 World Championships – 7th
 1998 Bangkok Asian Games – 1st 10 m air rifle individual, 2nd 10 m air rifle team
 1998 National Shooting Series – 1st (NR)
 1998 World Championships – 7th
 2000 Sydney Olympic Games – 1st 10 m air rifle (696.4pts, OR)
 2002 Pusan Asian Games – 1st 10 m air rifle team (1788pts, WR) & 50 m free rifle team (3472pts, AR)

References
 http://www.chinadaily.com.cn/olympics/2007-07/30/content_6003745.htm

External links
 

1977 births
Living people
ISSF rifle shooters
Olympic shooters of China
Chinese male sport shooters
Shooters at the 2000 Summer Olympics
Olympic gold medalists for China
Olympic medalists in shooting
Asian Games medalists in shooting
Sport shooters from Hebei
People from Chengde
Shooters at the 1998 Asian Games
Shooters at the 2002 Asian Games
Medalists at the 2000 Summer Olympics
Asian Games gold medalists for China
Asian Games silver medalists for China
Medalists at the 1998 Asian Games
Medalists at the 2002 Asian Games
20th-century Chinese people